Niklas Kieber (born 4 March 1993) is a Liechtensteiner footballer who last played for FC Triesenberg.

Career
Kieber began his career in 2000 with FC Triesen.

International career
He was a member of the Liechtenstein national under-21 football team and had 17 caps and two goals. Kieber made his debut for the senior team as a late substitute against Lithuania in a 2014 FIFA World Cup qualifying match in October 2012.

References

1993 births
Living people
Liechtenstein footballers
Liechtenstein international footballers
Liechtenstein under-21 international footballers
Liechtenstein youth international footballers
Association football forwards